Trnovci is a dispersed settlement in the Slovene Hills in the Municipality of Sveti Tomaž in northeastern Slovenia. The area belonged to the traditional region of Styria. It is now included in the Drava Statistical Region.

References

External links
Trnovci on Geopedia

Populated places in the Municipality of Sveti Tomaž